Jordanian Canadians are Canadian citizens of Jordanian descent or a Jordan-born person residing in Canada. According to the 2011 Census there were 39,425 Canadians who claimed Jordanian ancestry.

See also 

Arab Canadians

References 

 
Arab Canadian
Canada